Clayton Howard Riddell, OC (July 13, 1937 – September 15, 2018) was a Canadian billionaire businessman who was the founder, president and CEO of Paramount Resources, based in Calgary, Alberta.

Early life
He was born on a farm near Treherne, Manitoba on July 13, 1937, the youngest child of
Cecil Howard Riddell and Bertha Maude Riddell née Taylor. Riddell earned with a bachelor's degree in geology from the University of Manitoba.

Career
He was part owner of the Calgary Flames, and high-end Calgary restaurant Catch. With an estimated net worth of US$2.5 billion (as of March 2011), he was ranked by Forbes as the 12th wealthiest Canadian and 459th in the world.

Riddell was a president of the Canadian Society of Petroleum Geologists and chair of the Canadian Association of Petroleum Producers.

The Clayton H. Riddell Faculty of Environment, Earth, and Resources at the University of Manitoba is named in his honour. He donated $10 million to create an endowment fund for the faculty, which combines the Department of Environment and Geography, the Department of Geological Sciences and the Natural Resources Institute.

In 2008, Riddell was made an Officer of the Order of Canada for his leadership and philanthropy.

In May 2010, Carleton University announced the creation of Canada's first graduate program in political management, Clayton H. Riddell Graduate Program in Political Management, made possible through a donation from Riddell that is the largest in Carleton's history.

Personal life
He was married to Vi Thorarinson, a nurse for 49 years until her death from leukemia in 2012. They had three daughters and a son together, Lynne, Sue, Jim and Brenda. Sue Riddell Rose is the CEO of Perpetual Energy.

Riddell died on September 15, 2018, after a short illness.

References

External links
 University of Manitoba:Clayton H. Riddell Faculty of Environment, Earth, and Resources
 The Canadian Rich 100 List by the Canadian Business Magazine
 http://www.marketwatch.com/story/mgm-energy-corp-announces-receipt-of-proposal-from-paramount-resources-ltd-2014-03-11-817351?reflink=MW_news_stmp

1937 births
2018 deaths
Calgary Sports and Entertainment
Calgary Flames owners
Canadian billionaires
Canadian geologists
Officers of the Order of Canada
University of Manitoba alumni